Simone Jacquet Thrysøe  (born 3 April 1987) is a Danish ice hockey player and member of the Danish national ice hockey team, currently serving as captain of AaB Ishockey Damer in the KvindeLigaen.

She has represented Denmark at eleven IIHF Women's World Championships, including at the Top Division tournament of the 2021 IIHF Women's World Championship.

References

External links 
 

Living people
1987 births
Sportspeople from Aalborg
Danish women's ice hockey defencemen
Ice hockey players at the 2022 Winter Olympics
Olympic ice hockey players of Denmark